In geometry, the order-4 hexagonal tiling is a regular tiling of the hyperbolic plane. It has Schläfli symbol of {6,4}.

Symmetry 
This tiling represents a hyperbolic kaleidoscope of 6 mirrors defining a regular hexagon fundamental domain. This symmetry by orbifold notation is called *222222 with 6 order-2 mirror intersections. In Coxeter notation can be represented as [6*,4], removing two of three mirrors (passing through the hexagon center). Adding a bisecting mirror through 2 vertices of a hexagonal fundamental domain defines a trapezohedral *4422 symmetry. Adding 3 bisecting mirrors through the vertices defines *443 symmetry. Adding 3 bisecting mirrors through the edge defines *3222 symmetry. Adding all 6 bisectors leads to full *642 symmetry.

Uniform colorings 
There are 7 distinct uniform colorings for the order-4 hexagonal tiling. They are similar to 7 of the uniform colorings of the square tiling, but exclude 2 cases with order-2 gyrational symmetry. Four of them have reflective constructions and Coxeter diagrams while three of them are undercolorings.

Regular maps
The regular map {6,4}3 or {6,4}(4,0) can be seen as a 4-coloring on the {6,4} tiling. It also has a representation as a petrial octahedron, {3,4}, an abstract polyhedron with vertices and edges of an octahedron, but instead connected by 4 Petrie polygon faces.

Related polyhedra and tiling 

This tiling is topologically related as a part of sequence of regular tilings with hexagonal faces, starting with the hexagonal tiling, with Schläfli symbol {6,n}, and Coxeter diagram , progressing to infinity.

This tiling is also topologically related as a part of sequence of regular polyhedra and tilings with four faces per vertex, starting with the octahedron, with Schläfli symbol {n,4}, and Coxeter diagram , with n progressing to infinity.

See also

Square tiling
Tilings of regular polygons
List of uniform planar tilings
List of regular polytopes

References
 John H. Conway, Heidi Burgiel, Chaim Goodman-Strass, The Symmetries of Things 2008,  (Chapter 19, The Hyperbolic Archimedean Tessellations)

External links 

 Hyperbolic and Spherical Tiling Gallery
 KaleidoTile 3: Educational software to create spherical, planar and hyperbolic tilings
 Hyperbolic Planar Tessellations, Don Hatch

Hexagonal tilings
Hyperbolic tilings
Isogonal tilings
Isohedral tilings
Order-4 tilings
Regular tilings